Beach and Mason station is a streetcar station in San Francisco, California, serving the San Francisco Municipal Railway's E Embarcadero and F Market & Wharves heritage railway lines. It is located on Beach Street at Mason Street. The station opened on March 4, 2000, with the streetcar's extension to Fisherman's Wharf.

The stop is also served by the route  bus, plus the  bus route, which provides service along the F Market & Wharves and L Taraval lines during the late night hours when trains do not operate.

References

External links 
SFMTA: Beach St & Mason St
SFBay Transit (unofficial): Beach St & Mason St

Mason
Railway stations in the United States opened in 2000